Marco Markus Kabiay (born 17 February 1991) is an Indonesian professional footballer who plays as a full-back.

Club career

Cacusan CF
In February 2016, Marco joined Cacusan CF in the 2016 Liga Futebol Amadora, he was contracted for one year with his friend while still in Persipura Jayapura, Moses Banggo and Elvis Harewan.

Arema FC
In August 2017, Marco joined Arema, he was contracted for half season. and he made his debut against Mitra Kukar F.C. in the 24th week 2017 Liga 1.

Honours

Club honors
Persipura Jayapura
Indonesia Super League: 2010–11
Indonesian Inter Island Cup: 2011

Persija Jakarta
 Indonesia President's Cup: 2018

References

External links
 profil in Liga Indonesia Official Website
 Marco Kabiay at Soccerway

1991 births
Living people
Papuan people
Indonesian footballers
People from Jayapura
Persipura Jayapura players
Persiram Raja Ampat players
PSBS Biak Numfor players
Arema F.C. players
Persija Jakarta players
PSMS Medan players
Persewar Waropen players
Semen Padang F.C. players
Persis Solo players
Liga 1 (Indonesia) players
Association football central defenders
Indonesian expatriate footballers
Expatriate footballers in East Timor
Sportspeople from Papua